Ludwig G. Kempe  (October 16, 1915 – June 22, 2012) was an American neurosurgeon, author and illustrator.

He was an author of books in the field of neurosurgery and ornithology Along with Russell Blaylock, Kempe published a novel transcallosal approach to excising intraventricular meningiomas of the trigone, as well as developing the ventriculolymphatic shunt in the treatment of hydrocephalus.

Publications
2004. Kempe's Operative Neurosurgery, Volume 1. ,

References

1915 births
2012 deaths
American neurosurgeons
People from Prenzlau
People from the Province of Brandenburg